Ashley Foley (27 December 1915 – 20 February 2005) was an Australian rules footballer who played for the Geelong Football Club and Essendon Football Club in the Victorian Football League (VFL).

Notes

External links 
		

1915 births
2005 deaths
Australian rules footballers from Victoria (Australia)
Geelong Football Club players
Essendon Football Club players
Mooroopna Football Club players